The 1991 Forest Heath District Council election took place on 2 May 1991 to elect members of Forest Heath District Council in England. This was on the same day as other local elections.

Summary

|}

References

Forest Heath District Council elections
1991 English local elections
May 1991 events in the United Kingdom
1990s in Suffolk